Hanifa bin Ahmad is a Malaysian politician and currently serves as Kelantan State Executive Councillor.

Election Results

References

Malaysian Islamic Party politicians
Members of the Kelantan State Legislative Assembly
Kelantan state executive councillors
21st-century Malaysian politicians
Living people
People from Kelantan
Malaysian people of Malay descent
Malaysian Muslims
1946 births